East Ybor is a neighborhood within the city limits of Tampa, Florida. As of the 2010 census the neighborhood had a population of 536. The ZIP Codes serving the neighborhood is 33605. The neighborhood is located just east of the historic Ybor City.

Geography
East Ybor boundaries are Adamo Drive to the south, Interstate 4 to the north, 39th Street to the east and Ybor City to the west.

Demographics
At the 2010 census there were 536 people and 220 households residing in the neighborhood. The population density was 1,913/mi2. The racial makeup of the neighborhood was 33% White, 62% African American, 0% Native American, 1% Asian, 1% from other races, and 2% from two or more races. Hispanic or Latino of any race were 12%.

Of the 220 households 21% had children under the age of 18 living with them, 19% were married couples living together, 18% had a female householder with no husband present, and 15% were non-families. 39% of households were made up of individuals.

The age distribution was 20% under the age of 18, 24% from 18 to 34, 22% from 35 to 49, 22% from 50 to 64, and 15% 65 or older. For every 100 females, there were 123.3 males.

The per capita income for the neighborhood was $9,905. About 26% of the population were below the poverty line, 34% of those are under the age of 18.

See also
Neighborhoods in Tampa, Florida

References

External links
 East Ybor Historic and Civic Association 
Ybor City Neighborhood Resources
Community Map of East Ybor

Neighborhoods in Tampa, Florida